Practice management software may refer to software used for the management of a professional office:

Law practice management software
Medical practice management software
Veterinary practice management software

There are also practice management software for accounting, architecture, veterinary, dental, optometry and other practices.